The first running of the Tour of Flanders for Women, a women's road cycling race in Belgium, was held on 4 April 2004. It was the fourth round of the 2004 UCI Women's Road World Cup. Russian Zulfiya Zabirova won the race after an attack on the Muur van Geraardsbergen, at 16 km from the finish.

Race summary
With a total distance of 94 km, the inaugural women's Tour of Flanders was the shortest in history. The peloton was thinned out in the early stages by repeated attacks by Leontien van Moorsel, Hanka Kupfernagel and Mirjam Melchers. In Geraardsbergen, 16 km from the finish, Zulfiya Zabirova surged clear on the Muur. Zabirova never held more than 15 seconds over a three-woman group but maintained her solo effort to the finish, two weeks after claiming victory in the Primavera Rosa. At four seconds, German Trixi Worrack won the sprint for second place ahead of van Moorsel and Melchers. Russian Olga Slyusareva won the field sprint for fifth place, 1' 20" later.

Result

References

External links

2004
Tour
2004 UCI Women's Road World Cup